The 2014 Intermediate League World Series took place from July 29–August 4 in Livermore, California, United States. Nogales, Arizona defeated San Lorenzo, Puerto Rico in the championship game.

This year featured the debut of the Europe–Africa Region.

Teams

Results

United States Bracket

International Bracket

Consolation round

Elimination Round

References

Intermediate League World Series
Intermediate League World Series